Nawsheen is a Bangladeshi television and film actress who has worked in many notable popular films such as prarthona, Mukhosh Manush. She has also worked as model, anchor and radio personality. She has played some notable plays, and also earned a reputation. She is working as model in different television commercials and print media since 2007. Among her notable films include prarthona, Mukhosh Manush, hello Amit (yet to release), dudu mia (yet to release) shuachan pakhi (yet to release). She has worked as radio jockey and producer in many Bangladeshi FM radio stations like (Radio Today, Radio Foorti, Dhaka FM and radio amber)

Early life 

Nawsheen Nahreen Mou was born in Khulna district although her childhood was spent in many districts. Her father SK Amzad Hussain was an engineer of BUET and mother is Housewife. She started dancing at the age of 7 and continued it for several years. She achieved the Khelaghar Award in her childhood in 1994. She started her career as a radio jockey with the first fm radio station of Bangladesh Radio Today in 2007. She was very popular as RJ Nawsheen for her voice and renown show ‘today’s adda’.Later she joined Radio Foorti. She started her television career with a live calling program, which was broadcast on RTV. The name of the program was "Jege Acho ki". It was one of the most popular shows at that time (2008-2011). She was in news  for her other superhit programmes such as “Amar Ami’in Bangla Vision.

Career
Everyone knows Nawsheen Nahreen Mou as her short name Nawsheen. She launched her media career as a radio personality. Besides, She started working on commercial advertising. Now she is primarily known to everyone as an actress. She made her small screen debut with drama Dhoopchhaya. She made her film debut opposite her real life husband Hillol in Mukhosh Manush (2016). She is working as Freelance actress at television  media and film since  2008 in different TV serials mega aerials daily soaps and special fictions. 
She also worked as a model on various television commercials and print media. Previously she was working as Radio jockey and producer in fm radios of Bangladesh. She has Worked as director programme at radio amber from 2015 till 2017 and deputy programme director at a leading channel of Bangladesh in 2010 (channel I). She was Hosted ICC T20 cricket world cup 2013 ticket launching ceremony, national film award Bangladesh in 2016, BPL 2012 opening ceremony -Bangladesh Premier League first season and opening ceremony for ICC cricket World Cup in 2011.

Hosted programs

Brand ambassador
 Nature secret face wash 
 [[PRAN|Pran spice  
 Pran gura dudh
 fresh milk powder 
 Range freeze
 Hisense freeze
 Cooling A.C.
 So good television
 Keya detergent powder
 Banglalink network
 Elite fairness cream 
 Foamex mattress 
 Rosen 28
 Mangolee

TVC

Television drama

Filmography

Awards

See also

 Cinema of Bangladesh
 Media of Bangladesh
 Gangster Returns
 Tahsan Rahman Khan

References

Bangladeshi actresses
Bangladeshi television actresses
Bangladeshi film actresses
Bangladeshi radio personalities
Living people
1985 births
People from Khulna District
People from Khulna